Solomon Grigor'evich Mikhlin (real name Zalman Girshevich Mikhlin) (the family name is also transliterated as Mihlin or Michlin) (23 April 1908 – 29 August 1990) was a Soviet mathematician of who worked in the fields of linear elasticity, singular integrals and numerical analysis: he is best known for the introduction of the symbol of a singular integral operator, which eventually led to the foundation and development of the theory of pseudodifferential operators.

Biography 
According to a different version, his father was a melamed, at a primary religious school (kheder), and that the family was of modest means: according to the same source, Zalman was the youngest of five children. His first wife was Victoria Isaevna Libina: Mikhlin's book  is dedicated to her memory. She died of peritonitis in 1961 during a boat trip on Volga. In 1940 they adopted a son, Grigory Zalmanovich Mikhlin, who later emigrated to  Haifa, Israel. His second wife was Eugenia Yakovlevna Rubinova, born in 1918, who was his companion for the rest of his life.

Education and academic career

He graduated from a secondary school in Gomel in 1923 and entered the State Herzen Pedagogical Institute in 1925.  In 1927 he was transferred to the Department of Mathematics and Mechanics of Leningrad State University as a second year student, passing all the exams of the first year without attending lectures. Among his university professors there were Nikolai Maximovich Günther and Vladimir Ivanovich Smirnov. The latter became his master thesis supervisor: the topic of the thesis was the convergence of double series, and was defended in 1929. Sergei Lvovich Sobolev studied in the same class as Mikhlin. In 1930 he started his teaching career, working in some Leningrad institutes for short periods, as Mikhlin himself records on the document . In 1932 he got a position at the Seismological Institute of the USSR Academy of Sciences, where he worked till 1941: in 1935 he got the degree "Doktor nauk" in Mathematics and Physics, without having to earn the "kandidat nauk" degree, and finally in 1937 he was promoted to the rank of professor. During World War II he became professor at the  Kazakh University in Alma Ata. Since 1944 S.G. Mikhlin has been professor at the Leningrad State University. From 1964 to 1986 he headed the Laboratory of Numerical Methods at the Research Institute of Mathematics and Mechanics of the same university: since 1986 until his death he was a senior researcher at that laboratory.

Honours 
He received the order of the Badge of Honour in 1961: the name of the recipients of this prize was usually published in newspapers. He was awarded of the Laurea honoris causa by the Karl-Marx-Stadt (now Chemnitz) Polytechnic in 1968 and was elected member of the German Academy of Sciences Leopoldina in 1970 and of the Accademia Nazionale dei Lincei in 1981. As  states, in his country he did not receive honours comparable to his scientific stature, mainly because of the racial policy of the communist regime, briefly described in the following section.

Influence of communist antisemitism 
He lived in one of the most difficult periods of contemporary Russian history. The state of mathematical sciences during this period is well described by : marxist ideology rise in the USSR universities and Academia was one of the main themes of that period. Local administrators and communist party functionaries interfered with scientists on either ethnical or ideological grounds.  As a matter of fact, during the war and during the creation of a new academic system, Mikhlin did not experience the same difficulties as younger Soviet scientists of Jewish origin: for example he was included in the Soviet delegation in 1958, at the International Congress of Mathematicians in Edinburgh. However, examining the life of Mikhlin, finds it surprisingly similar to the life of Vito Volterra under the fascist regime. He notes that antisemitism in communist countries took different forms compared to his nazist counterpart: the communist regime aimed not to the brutal homicide of Jews, but imposed on them a number of constrictions, sometimes very cruel, in order to make their life difficult. During the period from 1963 to 1981, he met Mikhlin attending several conferences in the Soviet Union, and realised how he was in a state of isolation, almost marginalized inside his native community: Fichera describes several episodes revealing this fact. Perhaps, the most illuminating one is the election of Mikhlin as a member of the Accademia Nazionale dei Lincei: in June 1981, Solomon G. Mikhlin was elected Foreign Member of the class of mathematical and physical sciences of the Lincei. At first time, he was proposed as a winner of the Antonio Feltrinelli Prize, but the almost sure confiscation of the prize by the Soviet authorities induced the Lincei members to elect him as a member: they decided to honour him in a way that no political authority could alienate. However, Mikhlin was not allowed to visit Italy by the Soviet authorities, so Fichera and his wife brought the tiny golden lynx, the symbol of the Lincei membership, directly to Mikhlin's apartment in Leningrad on 17 October 1981: the only guests to that "ceremony" were Vladimir Maz'ya and his wife Tatyana Shaposhnikova.

Death 
On a public transport, he suffered a lethal stroke. He had no documents with him, therefore he was identified only some time after his death: this may be the cause of the difference in the death date reported on several biographies and obituary notices. Fichera also writes that Mikhlin's wife Eugenia survived him only a few months.

Work

Research activity 
He was author of monographs and textbooks which become classics for their style. His research is devoted mainly to the following fields.

Elasticity theory and boundary value problems
In mathematical elasticity theory, Mikhlin was concerned by three themes: the plane problem (mainly from 1932 to 1935), the theory of shells (from 1954) and the Cosserat spectrum (from 1967 to 1973). Dealing with the plane elasticity problem, he proposed two methods for its solution in multiply connected domains. The first one is based upon the so-called complex Green's function and the reduction of the related boundary value problem to integral equations. The second method is a certain generalization of the classical Schwarz algorithm for the solution of the Dirichlet problem in a given domain by splitting it in simpler problems in smaller domains whose union is the original one. Mikhlin studied its convergence and gave applications to special applied problems. He proved existence theorems for the fundamental problems of plane elasticity involving inhomogeneous anisotropic media: these results are collected in the book . Concerning the theory of shells, there are several Mikhlin's articles dealing with it. He studied the error of the approximate solution for shells, similar to plane plates, and found out that this error is small for the so-called purely rotational state of stress. As a result of his study of this problem, Mikhlin also gave a new (invariant) form of the basic equations of the theory. He also proved a theorem on perturbations of positive operators in a Hilbert space which let him to obtain an error estimate for the problem of approximating a sloping shell by a plane plate. Mikhlin studied also the spectrum of the operator pencil of the classical linear elastostatic operator or Navier–Cauchy operator

The full description of the spectrum and the proof of the completeness of the system of eigenfunctions are also due to Mikhlin, and partly to V.G. Maz'ya in their only joint work.

Singular integrals and Fourier multipliers
He is one of the founders of the multi-dimensional theory of singular integrals, jointly with Francesco Tricomi and Georges Giraud, and also one of the main contributors. By singular integral we mean an integral operator of the following form

Such operators are called singular since the singularity of the kernel of the operator is so strong that the integral does not exist in the ordinary sense, but only in the sense of Cauchy principal value. Mikhlin was the first to develop a theory of singular integral equations as a theory of operator equations in function spaces. In the papers  and  he found a rule for the composition of double singular integrals (i.e. in 2-dimensional euclidean spaces) and introduced the very important notion of symbol of a singular integral. This enabled him to show that the algebra of bounded singular integral operators is isomorphic to the algebra of either scalar or matrix-valued functions. He proved the Fredholm's theorems for singular integral equations and systems of such equations under the hypothesis of non-degeneracy of the symbol: he also proved that the index of a single singular integral equation in the euclidean space is zero. In 1961  Mikhlin developed a theory of multidimensional singular integral equations on Lipschitz spaces. These spaces are widely used in the theory of one-dimensional singular integral equations: however, the direct extension of the related theory to the multidimensional case meets some technical difficulties, and Mikhlin suggested another approach to this problem. Precisely, he obtained the basic properties of this kind of singular integral equations as a by-product of the  Lp-space theory of these equations. Mikhlin also proved a now classical theorem on multipliers of Fourier transform in the Lp-space, based on an analogous theorem of Józef Marcinkiewicz on Fourier series. A complete collection of his results in this field up to the 1965, as well as the contributions of other mathematicians like Tricomi, Giraud, Calderón and Zygmund, is contained in the monograph .

A synthesis of the theories of singular integrals and linear partial differential operators was accomplished, in the mid sixties of the 20th century, by the theory of pseudodifferential operators: Joseph J. Kohn, Louis Nirenberg, Lars Hörmander and others operated this synthesis, but this theory owe his rise to the discoveries of Mikhlin, as is universally acknowledged. This theory has numerous applications to mathematical physics. Mikhlin's multiplier theorem is widely used in different branches of mathematical analysis, particularly to the theory of differential equations. The analysis of Fourier multipliers was later forwarded by Lars Hörmander, Walter Littman, Elias Stein, Charles Fefferman and others.

Partial differential equations
In four papers, published in the period 1940–1942, Mikhlin applies the potentials method to the mixed problem for the wave equation. In particular, he solves the mixed problem for the two-space dimensional wave equation in the half plane by reducing it to the planar Abel integral equation. For plane domains with a sufficiently smooth curvilinear boundary he reduces the problem to an integro-differential equation, which he is also able to solve when the boundary of the given domain is analytic. In 1951 Mikhlin proved the convergence of the Schwarz alternating method for second order elliptic equations. He also applied the methods of functional analysis, at the same time as Mark Vishik but independently of him, to the investigation of boundary value problems for degenerate second order elliptic partial differential equations.

Numerical mathematics
His work in this field can be divided into several branches: in the following text, four main branches are described, and a sketch of his last researches is also given. The papers within the first branch are summarized in the monograph , which contain the study of convergence of variational methods for problems connected with positive operators, in particular, for some problems of mathematical physics. Both "a priori" and "a posteriori" estimates of the errors concerning the approximation given by these methods are proved. The second branch deals with the notion of stability of a numerical process introduced by Mikhlin himself. When applied to the variational method, this notion enables him to state necessary and sufficient conditions in order to minimize errors in the solution of the given problem when the error arising in the numerical construction of the algebraic system resulting from the application of the method itself is sufficiently small, no matter how large is the system's order. The third branch is the study of variational-difference and finite element methods. Mikhlin studied the completeness of the coordinate functions used in this methods in the Sobolev space }, deriving the order of approximation as a function of the smoothness properties of the functions to be approximation of functions approximated. He also characterized the class of coordinate functions which give the best order of approximation, and has studied the stability of the variational-difference process and the growth of the condition number of the variation-difference matrix. Mikhlin also studied the finite element approximation in weighted Sobolev spaces related to the numerical solution of degenerate elliptic equations. He found the optimal order of approximation for some methods of solution of variational inequalities. The fourth branch of his research in numerical mathematics is a method for the solution of Fredholm integral equations which he called resolvent method: its essence rely on the possibility of substituting the kernel of the integral operator by its variational-difference approximation, so that the  resolvent of the new kernel can be expressed by simple recurrence relations. This eliminates the need to construct and solve large systems of equations. During his last years, Mikhlin contributed to the theory of errors in numerical processes, proposing the following classification of errors.
Approximation error: is the error due to the replacement of an exact problem by an approximating one.
Perturbation error: is the error due to the inaccuracies in the computation of the data of the approximating problem.
Algorithm error: is the intrinsic error of the algorithm used for the solution of the approximating problem.
Rounding error: is the error due to the limits of computer arithmetic.
This classification is useful since enables one to develop computational methods adjusted in order to diminish the errors of each particular type, following the divide et impera (divide and rule) principle.

Teaching activity
He was the "kandidat nauk" advisor of Tatyana O. Shaposhnikova. He was also mentor and friend of Vladimir Maz'ya: he was never his official supervisor, but his friendship with the young undergraduate Maz'ya had a great influence on shaping his mathematical style.

Selected publications

Books
. The book of Mikhlin summarizing his results in the plane elasticity problem: according to  this is a widely known monograph in the theory of integral equations.
.
. A masterpiece in the multidimensional theory of singular integrals and singular integral equations summarizing all the results from the beginning to the year of publication, and also sketching the history of the subject.
.
.
.

Papers
.
. The paper, with French title and abstract, where Solomon Mikhlin introduces the symbol of a singular integral operator as a means to calculate the composition of such kind of operators and solve singular integral equations: the integral operators considered here are defined by integration on the whole n-dimensional (for n = 2) euclidean space.
. In this paper, with French title and abstract, Solomon Mikhlin extends the definition of the symbol of a singular integral operator introduced before in the paper  to integral operators defined by integration on a (n − 1)-dimensional closed manifold (for n = 3) in n-dimensional euclidean space.
.
. 
.
. 
. 
. 
.

.

See also 
Linear elasticity
Mikhlin multiplier theorem
Multiplier (Fourier analysis)
Singular integrals
Singular integral equations

Notes

References

Biographical and general references
.
.
.
.
.
. A short survey of the work of Mikhlin by a friend and his pupil: not as complete as the commemorative paper , but very useful for the English speaking reader.
.
. See also the final version available from the "George Lorentz" section of the Approximation Theory web page at the Mathematics Department of the Ohio State University (retrieved on 25 October 2009).
. Some vivid recollection about Gaetano Fichera by his colleague and friend Vladimir Gilelevich Maz'ya: there is a short description of the "ceremony" for the election of Mikhlin as a foreign member of the Accademia Nazionale dei Lincei.
.
Solomon Grigor'evich Mikhlin's entry at the Russian Wikipedia, Retrieved 28 May 2010.
. An official resume written by Mikhlin itself to be used by the public authority in the former Soviet Union: it contains very useful (if not unique) information about his early career and school formation.

Scientific references
. 
.
.

External links 

.
. Memorial page at the St. Petersburg Mathematical Pantheon.

1908 births
1990 deaths
People from Rechytsa District
People from Rechitsky Uyezd
Belarusian Jews
Jewish scientists
Mathematical analysts
Mathematical physicists
Soviet mathematicians
Herzen University alumni